Phoneutria is a genus of spiders in the family Ctenidae. They are mainly found in northern South America, with one species in Central America. Members of the genus are commonly referred to as Brazilian wandering spiders. Other English names include armed spiders (armadeiras in Brazilian Portuguese) and banana spiders (a name shared with several others).

Description
While some other  araneomorph spiders have a longer leg span, the largest Phoneutria species have the longest body and the greatest body weight in this group. The genus is distinguished from other related genera such as Ctenus by the presence of dense prolateral scopulae (a dense brush of fine hairs) on the pedipalp tibiae and tarsi in both sexes. Phoneutria are easily confused with several other non-medically significant ctenids, especially Cupiennius, in which the recently described C. chiapanensis also has bright red hairs on the chelicerae. Additionally, some Phoneutria species lack red hairs on the chelicerae, making it an unreliable identification feature. The presence of a dark linear stripe or stripes on the frontal (dorsal) palps and presence of a single thin black line running anterior-posterior along the dorsal carapace may help identify Phoneutria. Other features are the strong ventral marking on the underside of the legs with contrasting dark mid-segments and lighter joints, and the pattern on the ventral (underside) of the abdomen with several rows of black dots, or an overall reddish colour.

The characteristic defensive posture with frontal legs held high is an especially good indicator to confirm a specimen is Phoneutria, especially alongside correct colour patterns. During the defensive display the body is lifted up into an erect position, the first two pairs of legs are lifted high (revealing the conspicuous black/light-banded pattern on the leg underside), while the spider sways from side to side with hind legs in a cocked position.

Taxonomy

The genus Phoneutria was started by Maximilian Perty in 1833. The genus name is from the Greek φονεύτρια, meaning "murderess". Perty placed two species in the genus: Phoneutria rufibarbis and Phoneutria fera. The former is treated as a nomen dubium; the latter is the type species of the genus.

Species

, the World Spider Catalog accepted the following species:
Phoneutria bahiensis Simó & Brescovit, 2001 – Brazil
Phoneutria boliviensis (F. O. Pickard-Cambridge, 1897) – Central, South America
Phoneutria depilata (Strand, 1909) –  Guatemala, Honduras, Nicaragua, Costa Rica, Panama, Colombia, Ecuador
Phoneutria eickstedtae Martins & Bertani, 2007 – Brazil
Phoneutria fera Perty, 1833 (type) – Colombia, Ecuador, Peru, Brazil, Suriname, Guyana
Phoneutria keyserlingi (F. O. Pickard-Cambridge, 1897) – Brazil
Phoneutria nigriventer (Keyserling, 1891) – Brazil, Uruguay, Paraguay, Argentina
Phoneutria pertyi (F. O. Pickard-Cambridge, 1897) – Brazil
Phoneutria reidyi (F. O. Pickard-Cambridge, 1897) – Colombia, Venezuela, Peru, Brazil, Guyana

Behaviour
Wandering spiders are so-called because they wander the jungle floor at night, rather than residing in a lair or maintaining a web. During the day they hide inside termite mounds, under fallen logs and rocks, in banana plants (hence the "banana spider" nickname), and bromeliads. P. nigriventer is known to hide in dark and moist places in or near human dwellings.

P. nigriventer mates during the dry season from April to June, which leads to frequent observations of the species during this time.

Distribution
Phoneutria are found in forests from Costa Rica southwards throughout South America east of the Andes including Colombia, Venezuela, the Guianas, Ecuador, Peru, Bolivia, Brazil, Paraguay, and into northern Argentina. Three species (P. reidyi, P. boliviensis and P. fera) are found in the Amazon region, one species (P. fera) is restricted to the Amazon, and one (P. boliviensis) ranges into Central America in Panama and Costa Rica. The remaining species are restricted to Atlantic Forest of Argentina, Paraguay and Brazil, including forest fragments in the Cerrado savanna. In Brazil, Phoneutria is only absent in the northeastern region north of Salvador, Bahia.

Phoneutria has been introduced to Chile and Uruguay.

Banana shipments 
These spiders acquired their other common name, "banana spider", because it is claimed that they are occasionally found in shipments of bananas, though the number of reports is exaggerated due to common misidentifications of unrelated spiders. A survey of spiders found in international shipments to North America revealed that only 7 of 135 spiders were Phoneutria species, six being Phoneutria boliviensis from bananas and one Phoneutria nigriventer from a shipment of electrical parts. Spiders from genera such as Cupiennius had been misidentified by experienced arachnologists. Cases continue to be reported but without evidence of expert identification. In 2005, a man was bitten in Bridgwater, England by a spider in a shipment of bananas and, in 2014, a south London family photographed a spider that they claim was in a bunch of bananas delivered to their home.

Medical significance

The genus Phoneutria includes some of the relatively few species of spiders known to present a threat to humans. Danger to humans does not only comprise toxicity, but also factors such as the spider's capacity to deliver a sufficient dose of venom, a disposition that makes a bite likely, and proximity to human habitation.  The actual incidence of death or serious injury must also be considered. These spiders' wandering nature is another reason they are considered so dangerous. In densely populated areas, Phoneutria species usually search for cover and dark places to hide during daytime, leading them to hide in houses, clothes, cars, boots, boxes and log piles, where they may bite if accidentally disturbed.

Spider mouthparts are adapted to envenomate very small prey; they are not well-adapted to attacking large mammals such as humans. Some believe that various spiders like Phoneutria, that use venom mainly to kill prey, can deliver a "dry" bite in defense to purposely conserve their venom, as opposed to a more primitive spider like Atrax that usually delivers a full load. A study in March 2009 suggests that Phoneutria inject venom in approximately one-third of their bites, and only a small quantity in one-third of those cases. Another study similarly suggested that only 2.3% of bites (mainly in children) were serious enough to require antivenom. Other studies, as cited in the Wolfgang Bücherl studies, showed that the toxicity of Phoneutria venom was clearly more potent than both Latrodectus and Atrax. Research in this area is hindered by the difficulty of identifying particular species. Nevertheless, there are a few well-attested instances of death. In one case, a single spider killed two children in São Sebastião. The spider was positively identified as a Phoneutria by Wolfgang Bücherl. Fatalities are usually attributed to respiratory arrest, secondary to systemic effects, or directly to envenoming. Systemic effects occur in 9% to 27% of cases; symptoms at the sites are more frequent, occurring from 83% to 96% of cases. The severity of the cases can be related to the sex of the spider, since the male produces less venom and is less lethal than the females, except for P. boliviensis, where the male is more toxic. Symptoms may appear within 10 to 20 minutes after the bite, and death within two to six hours, where severe pain radiates to the rest of the limb, systemic effects include tachycardia, increased blood pressure, vertigo, fever, sweating, visual disturbances, nausea, vomiting, difficulty breathing and paralysis. Death is usually caused by respiratory arrest. These spiders seem to produce a smaller amount of venom during cold months (June to September) a minimum amount of 0.03 mg, an average of 0.44 mg and a maximum of 1.84 mg, during the summer months. The maximum amount among individuals was 3.10 mg (October 26), 4 mg (November 3), 5 mg (November 4) and 8 mg (October 31); 7 mg of dried venom is enough to kill 500 mice subcutaneously and 1,000 intravenously.

P. nigriventer is the species responsible for most cases of envenomation in Brazil because it is commonly found in highly populated areas of southeastern Brazil, such as the states of São Paulo, Minas Gerais, Rio de Janeiro and Espírito Santo. The species P. fera is native to the northern portion of South America in the Amazon of Brazil, Venezuela, Ecuador, Peru and the Guyanas.

Reported cases 
A 45-year-old man, with no nervous background, employed in the agricultural section of the Butantan Institute, working barefoot, was bitten at 10:40 AM on the small toe of his left foot by a medium-sized Phoneutria. Immediately he felt intense pain that radiated to his foot and leg. He also reports visual disturbances, and when he tried to enter the house, he fell, without strength, he was supported by two men to the laboratory, where he was examined, he could not stand, had difficulty seeing, difficulty talking (he could not answer questions), and complained of severe general pain and intense cold. He was sweating profusely, there was hyper nasal secretion and salivation, which made him blow his nose and spit constantly. He was agitated, with generalized tremors and continuous cramps in his left foot and leg, and an irregular pulse with 112 beats per minute. An hour after the accident, the serum was injected into the left buttock. During the next hour, the pulse became faster, thready, almost uncountable, and the temperature decreased, with a worsening of the general condition. At 12 o'clock, a new injection of serum and at 13 o'clock, there was an improvement in the state.

In another case, a 22-year-old woman, four months pregnant, was bitten on the hand. She experienced severe generalized pain with paroxysm, had difficulty keeping up and talking, moaned, had cramps, generalized tremors, excessive sweating, and rapid pulse (140–150 beats per minute); after receiving the antidote the victim stabilized. In another case, a 16-year-old boy was bitten on his left hand. The victim had severe general pain, visual disturbance, generalized tremors, cramps, profuse sweating, and a weak, irregular to rapid pulse.

A 23-year-old market worker moving a bunch of bananas was bitten on his hand by P. nigriventer in São Paulo, Brazil. The specimen measured 3.5 cm long and 6 cm with his legs. It was reported that the wound was extremely painful, with the victim noticing that the bite area was sweating and the hair on his skin stood on end. He also reported that the pain radiated to his chest, and that his heart began to race. The victim was dizzy and nauseated, felt cold, began to drool and vomit, and exhibited priapism. He was later treated with anesthetics, tetanus prophylaxis and anti-venom, and recovered 36 hours after the bite.

Another case occurred with a 52-year-old man, bitten by an adult female P. nigriventer. Immediately after the bite he experienced severe local pain, blurred vision, profuse sweating and vomiting. From one to two hours after the bite he presented agitation and high blood pressure; at four hours after the heart rate was high at 150 beats per minute, mild tachypnea, cold extremities, profuse sweating, generalized tremors and priapism. He was treated with anesthetics, anti-venom and fluid replacement.

In 2005, an English man was bitten twice by a spider identified as a Phoneutria, which was hidden in a box of bananas. It was reported that his hand became swollen, he felt dizzy, and that when he got home he collapsed. He was taken to the hospital and received treatment, but his condition continued to deteriorate. He reported chest tightness, difficulty breathing, and both his blood pressure and heart rate were high. He was treated with increased saline to release toxins from the body, and was discharged the next day. He took almost a week to recover.

A 70-year-old man, bitten by a spider with a legspan of 5 to 6 cm, he was cutting sugarcane at the residence of São Pedro de Alcantara, in the countryside, when a spider jumped on his shoulder, and came "walking" by the right arm to the back where it bit his hand (bled at the time), he felt intense pain at the time. The spider had several young in the abdomen. The patient evolved with agitation, anxiety, blood pressure 200x110 mmHg, heart rate with 62 beats per minute, respiratory rate 36 breathing movements per minute, respiratory distress, hyperemia, edema and radiating pain. After 50 minutes, the patient was admitted to the emergency department of the HU with blood pressure 150x90 (after captopril), mild dyspnea (patient pneumectomized by TU), with paresthesias and local condition as previously reported. He received anesthetic infiltration, dipyrone and two vials of serum, the right hand remained red and swollen, with improvement in anxiety symptoms and controlled blood pressure.

Another case occurred in Minas Gerais, Brazil, where a man bitten by a Phoneutria developed numbness in his legs, redness, headache and loss of sense of time and space.

Some reports of deaths
Case that occurred in Itanhaém, São Paulo, 40-year-old man bitten in the foot, presented significant pain and generalized contractures, dying 6 hours after the accident.

A 7-year-old child, bitten in the ear, presented convulsions, opisthotonos and progressive paralysis, dying 17 hours after the accident.

Case that occurred in Franca, SP, a 10-year-old child bitten on the middle finger of the right hand, presented severe pain, trismus, tremors in the right arm and face, evolving to permanent contracture, respiratory paralysis, cyanosis and convulsions, dying in 30–40 minutes after the accident.

Case occurred in São Sebastião, São Paulo, two brothers, 6 months and 18 months old, the children woke up during the night crying and screaming, dying soon after (time of death is not described). The father removed the sheets and found the spider, which was referred to the Butantan Institute, identified as a large female Phoneutria nigriventer.

A 3-year-old girl, bitten on the third finger of her right hand, presented immediate local pain, periods of alternating prostration, cold sweating, chest and abdomen pains and 3 episodes of vomiting, was admitted to UNICAMP 3 hours after the accident, with the same symptoms. 5 vials of AV (Antivenom) and local anesthetic infiltration were administered, and there was improvement in symptoms, with decrease in sweating, but still agitated, 2–3 hours after AV, there was a picture of significant diarrhea (semi-liquid stools) evolving to 2nd degree dehydration. Parenteral hydration was started, 3h30 min post AV, her heart rate was 160 beats per minute, and respiratory rate was 72 at 4 hours post AV. Between 4h15min and 4h30min after AV, she had peripheral cyanosis, a heart rate of 150 beats per minute and dyspnea, and loss of peripheral venous access. Afterwards, there was disseminated pulmonary stortoration, and worsening of agitation, dyspnea and bradycardia, while being performed orotracheal intubation, manual ventilation, adrenaline and external cardiac massage, she later died.

Footnotes

External links

Venomous South American spider found in Manitoba grocery store CBC News
Spider gives pupils the creeps BBC News Online
Deadly spider found in banana box BBC News Online
Spider found between bananas in Dutch supermarket
Pub chef bitten by deadly spider BBC News Online
Web used to trace deadly spider BBC News Online
An illustrative set of pictures of Ctenidae
Picture of P. nigriventer
Spider Venom Could Boost Sex Life BBC News Online
Spider killed in danish supermarket
Brazilian wandering spider killed in Dutch hypermarket
'World's Deadliest Spider' Found in Whole Foods Produce Section.
Mother finds dozens of world's deadliest spiders on Sainsbury's bananas London Evening Standard, 4 November 2013.

Priapism
Ctenidae
Araneomorphae genera
Taxa named by Maximilian Perty